The 1990 New England Patriots season was the team's 31st, and 21st in the National Football League (NFL). It was the first for head coach Rod Rust, who was looking to improve on the 5-11 mark from the year before that cost Raymond Berry, who had led the Patriots to the playoffs twice in his tenure, his job.

The Patriots instead finished the season with a record of 1–15, the worst record in franchise history. They finished last in the AFC East Division and dead last in the NFL. The roster still had a number of All-Pros and regular contributors from their successful teams of the 1980s, but many of them were past the peak of their career, and the team lacked any young talent to replace them. After the team started 1–1, they would go on to lose their next fourteen games, many in humiliating fashion. Off the field, the team and its management were embarrassed by the harassment of a reporter during a locker room interview.

17 years later, the Patriots won all 16 regular season games, becoming the first team since the AFL-NFL merger to have both a one-win season and an undefeated season.

Offseason 

After several successful seasons in the mid-1980s, the 1989 season had been a disappointment, as the Patriots finished 5–11 and fired head coach Raymond Berry. To replace him, the team hired Rod Rust, a long-time defensive coach who had served as defensive coordinator for several NFL teams, including a 5-season tenure with the Patriots that included their (to that point) only Super Bowl appearance following the 1985 season. The team also traded wide receiver Stanley Morgan, at that point the best receiver in team history, to Indianapolis. Most of the team returned from the 1989 team, however many of the key starters from most of the 1980s such as future Pro Football Hall of Fame linebacker Andre Tippett, quarterback Steve Grogan (who would finish his career with the most games in a Patriots uniform), cornerback Ronnie Lippett, and defensive end Garin Veris were all in the twilight of their careers. Among former Pro Bowlers returning to the team were offensive lineman Bruce Armstrong and wide receiver Irving Fryar.

Season Recap 

The team opened with a close-played loss to Miami in week 1 in which quarterback Steve Grogan outplayed his Miami counterpart, future Hall-of-Famer Dan Marino. Marino threw three interceptions during the game, while Grogan had none, however Miami running back Sammie Smith made up the difference, rushing for 159 on the ground and a third quarter touchdown that kept Miami in the game. After harassing Marino all game, the defense gave up a crucial fourth quarter touchdown from Marino to running back Tony Paige for the go-ahead score late in the fourth quarter.

They rebounded in week 2 with a win over the Indianapolis Colts in a defensive struggle in which the Patriots picked off Colts quarterback Jeff George four times. Kicker Jason Staurovsky was the hero of the game, hitting three field goals in a 16–14 win. After two games, the team was 1–1, and the defense had intercepted the opposing quarterbacks seven times in just two games, as well as forcing three fumbles and recovering two of these. That gave the Patriots a 9–1 turnover differential, with the offense playing well enough to keep the teams in games. The day after the victory over the Colts, after the conclusion of the Monday practice, tight end Zeke Mowatt, running back Robert Perryman and wide receiver Michael Timpson allegedly stood in front of Boston Herald reporter Lisa Olson semi-naked and sexually harassed her in the Patriots locker room at Foxboro Stadium. The incident proved a major embarrassment for the franchise. The media firestorm surrounding the event proved a major distraction to the team in preparation for their next game.

Steve Grogan had been suffering nagging injuries for most of the previous several games, and with Marc Wilson, a former starter for the Oakland Raiders, healthy, Rust decided to start him. The decision proved disastrous, as the team was blown out in week 3 by the Bengals 41–7, with the defense failing to live up to the form they showed in the first two games, and the offense entirely ineffective. Wilson himself was benched late in the game for Tommy Hodson, who completed four passes once the game was already out of control.

Rust would inexplicably stay with Marc Wilson for the next three games, probably owing to Grogan's failing health and Hodson's lack of game experience, but Wilson would lose the next three games in succession, including a three-interception, zero-touchdown performance against division rival New York Jets in week 4, a 33–20 loss to the Seahawks in Week 5, and following a bye in week 6, a 17–10 loss to the Dolphins in week 7.

In week 8, Grogan was given the starting job back, but out of rhythm and hobbled by injury, he was also ineffective, going 15-for-31 with two interceptions in a 27–10 loss against the Bills in what would be his final start as a Patriot. Wilson got the job back the following week, but he too lost to the Eagles 48–20, in which the defense was noted for its lack of effort, a stark contrast to the team which had been so defensively dominant over the first two games of the season. Week 10 saw what was perhaps the most unwatchable football of the season, in which neither the Patriots nor the Colts seemed to want to win the game; Wilson threw for only 87 yards in that game, and his counterpart Jeff George for only 106. Despite only mustering 155 total yards on offense, the Colts won 13–10. Wilson would keep his starting job for only one more week, a 14–0 shut-out at the hands of Buffalo, in which Wilson threw two interceptions.

Faced with a lost season, Rust handed the reins to Tom Hodson, who would start at quarterback for the rest of the season. Hodson started promising; in his first start in week 12 against the Phoenix Cardinals, he went 17-for-29 with two touchdowns and no interceptions, but the defense could not stop the potent Cardinals rushing attack, and they ended up with 201 yards on the ground and four rushing touchdowns, including two from quarterback Timm Rosenbach, to crush the Patriots 34–14. A 37–7 loss to the Chiefs, in which Hodson threw an interception but no touchdowns, and in which the Patriots could only get 64 yards rushing came in week 13, and a similarly anemic Patriots offense could only muster a field goal and 182 yards in a 24–3 loss to the Steelers.

They lost a nationally televised game in week 15 to the Washington Redskins in which they were down 9–0 before the Redskins even ran an offensive play. The Redskins' two first-quarter scores came on a Kurt Gouveia fumble return for a touchdown, and the Patriots snapping the ball out of the end zone for a safety. The announced crowd for the game, played in driving rain, was 22,286. The Patriots’ final game of the season, against the eventual Super Bowl champion New York Giants, drew a sellout crowd to Foxboro, but over 40,000 fans were rooting for the visitors, as tickets to Giants home games were nearly impossible to come by for non-season-ticket holders.

The Patriots’ negative-265 point-differential (181 points scored, 446 points surrendered) was the worst total of the 1990s. It is notable that like the previous season's Dallas Cowboys, the Patriots played only three teams with non-winning records – divisional rivals the Indianapolis Colts and New York Jets plus one game against the Phoenix Cardinals – all season.

The 1990 Patriots and 1981 Baltimore Colts are the only NFL teams since 1940 to have eleven losses during which they never led in one season.

The 1990 Patriots became the third team to end a season at 1–15, and were matched by the 1991 Colts the next year. They also tied the 1976 Tampa Bay Buccaneers for most consecutive losses inside one season (the Buccaneers lost all 14 games, with the NFL only adopting a sixteen-game schedule in 1978), a record later eclipsed by the 15-straight losing 2001 Carolina Panthers. It was then topped by the 0–16 2008 Detroit Lions and 0–16 2017 Cleveland Browns.

Personnel

Staff

Roster

Regular season

Schedule

Season summary

Week 1

Week 2

Week 3

Week 4

Week 5

Week 7

Week 8

Week 9

Week 10

Week 11

Week 12

Week 13

Week 14

Week 15

Week 16

Week 17

Standings

See also 
 New England Patriots seasons

References 

New England Patriots
New England Patriots seasons
New England Patriots
Sports competitions in Foxborough, Massachusetts